Yeungnam University Hospital Station is a station of Daegu Subway Line 1 in Daemyeong-dong, Nam District, Daegu, South Korea. It is located near the Yeungnam University Medical Center, Myeongdeok Market, Korea Buddhism University, Daeguaneumsa Temple and Nam-gu Office.

Station layout

External links 
 DTRO virtual station

Nam District, Daegu
Railway stations opened in 1997
Daegu Metro stations
Yeungnam University